The eighth round of the V8 Supercar Championship was held at Winton Motor Raceway in Benalla, Victoria, on the weekend of August 1 to August 3 of 2008.

Qualifying 
Qualifying was held on Saturday August 2. Chris Pither rejoined the series driving the Team Kiwi Racing Falcon, replacing Kayne Scott as the team continued to struggle from one drama to the next. Mark Winterbottom was too quick for the field, securing pole position.

Race 1 
Race 1 was held on Saturday August 2. Mark Winterbottom started from pole position and lead early but a puncture caused by debris dumped the series points leader down the field as he limped the car around, keeping the car on track until the compulsory pit stop window opened.

Will Davison emerged from the pit stop cycle in the race lead but was over taken by Jamie Whincup while Davison was vulnerable with cold tyres. Whincup went on to take his fifth race win of the year. Davison ran home for second with Garth Tander first Holden in third. Fourth place was Jason Richards best of season for both him and the Tasman Motorsports team. Steven Richards was fifth with Lee Holdsworth finishing sixth. Todd Kelly was well up in seventh with ninth an excellent result for Michael Caruso. Winterbottom recovered to 21st position.

After racing was completed Holdsworth was penalised 32 seconds after contact with Rick Kelly had sent the HSV Dealer Team driver off the circuit, dropping him to effectively 18th position.

Race 2 
Race 2 was held on Sunday August 3. Contact between Jason Richards and Steven Richards resulted in Jason Richards spinning in front of the field at just the second corner of the race. Russell Ingall was put out of the race after contact with Steven Richards damaged the front end of his Commodore as Richards moved right to avoid. Michael Caruso was jammed against the wall by the crashing Jason Richards. Mark Skaife was punted by another car into a wall on the inside as he tried to avoid the developing accident. The final victim was Steven Richards a broken rear axle sidelining the Falcon late in the race. The car was given a patch repair and sent out to finish the race to get some points.

Will Davison again emerged from the pitstop cycle in the lead, this time with enough of a buffer over the second place that he raced on to take his second V8 Supercar race win. Hard-charging Mark Winterbottom blitzed the field to climb into second position after the pitstops. Garth Tander was again third ahead of teammates Jamie Whincup and Craig Lowndes with Rick Kelly sixth.

Lee Holdsworth recovered from his penalty for a fine seventh position. He had been the centre of chaos on the grid after he was sent out by his team to start sixth after the Garry Rogers Motorsport team protested the validity of the overnight stewards meeting that had penalised him. He did take up 18th grid spot however and fought his way back through the field. Jason Bright finished eighth in a season best result for the struggling Britek Motorsport team.

Shane van Gisbergen received a drive-through penalty for crossing the painted 'blend line' at pit lane exit where the pit lane blends back into the racetrack. He would later receive a second drive-through after he made a significant short-cut of the circuit after spearing off. Greg Murphy had a huge spin after contact with Michael Patrizi for which the young Ford Rising Stars Racing driver was given a drive-through penalty.

Race 3 
Race 3 was held on Sunday August 3. Mark Winterbottom got the jump off the start for Race 3, and led Will Davison and Garth Tander into turn one. However Tander jumped into second place by passing Davison at turn 3 on the opening lap. At the same time as this was happening, race leader Winterbottom locked a front tyre and ran off the circuit onto the grass. Upon re-entering the track he made contact with Todd Kelly, and spun off at turn four, this time into the sand trap. This brought the safety car out on lap one to clear the stuck Ford Performance Racing car of Winterbottom, with Tander becoming the new race leader and Davison in second. It turned out to be a disastrous race for the Ford Performance Racing team, with Steven Richards also involved in an accident, resulting in a bent steering arm and subsequent retirement from the race.

The order changed at the front of the field after the compulsory pitstops were complete. With Garth Tander choosing to stay out longer before taking his pitstop, Will Davison and Jamie Whincup pitted, with Whincup performing his stop one lap beforehand. When leaving the pitlane, Davison surrendered second position to Whincup, who was already on warmer tyres. James Courtney was one of the last of the front-runners to take his pitstop, however a drama with the left rear tyre not been put on properly during the stop resulted in the wheel falling off the car only a few metres from leaving his pitbox. This ruined Courtney's race three hopes, with the team having to use a manual jack to lift the car off the ground to get it back to the pit box.

After his penalty earlier in the day, Lee Holdsworth recovered well, coming out in third position after pitting. Tander continued to lead the rest of the race, taking his fifth race victory for the season. The race win also bumped Tander back up into the lead position in the championship.

Results
Results as follows:

Qualifying

Standings
After round 8 of 14.

Support categories
The 2008 Winton round of the V8 Supercar Championship had four support categories.

References

External links
Official timing and results

Winton round of the V8 Supercar Championship
August 2008 sports events in Australia